Ashlyn Krueger and Robin Montgomery were the reigning champions, but Krueger is no longer eligible to participate in junior events and Montgomery chose not to participate.

Lucie Havlíčková and Diana Shnaider won the title, defeating Carolina Kuhl and Ella Seidel in the final, 6–3, 6–2.

Seeds

Draw

Finals

Top half

Bottom half

References
Main Draw

Girls' Doubles
2022